The Kaiser Wilderness is a federally designated wilderness protected area located  northeast of Fresno in the state of California, USA. It was added to the National Wilderness Preservation System by the United States Congress on October 19, 1976.

The Kaiser Wilderness stretches along an east–west ridge and is separated from the High Sierra by the South Fork San Joaquin River canyon. Although a small wilderness, it is part of the almost contiguous federal wilderness areas along the Sierra Nevada Mountain Range with the John Muir Wilderness on the east, and Ansel Adams Wilderness to the northeast. Immediately south is Huntington Lake, a rustic summer time resort area. China Peak Ski Resort lies south of the Wilderness as well

The forest consists of white fir, Jeffrey pine, red fir, western white pine, and mountain hemlock.  On Kaiser Ridge there are stands of lodgepole pine, and at timberline whitebark pine and Sierra juniper grow in  mats of krummholtz.  Willows and alders grow along the perennial streams that form the drainage area of the South Fork of the San Joaquin River.

Some of the popular lakes in the Kaiser Wilderness are Nellie Lake, George Lake, and Upper Twin Lake, with Upper Twin Lake having a cave where the outlet stream disappears into and then flows underground for several hundred yards before resurfacing.

Recreational activities include day hiking, backpacking, horseback riding, fishing, rock scrambling, nature photography and snowshoeing. A wilderness permit is required for overnight trips into the Kaiser Wilderness. The Forest Service encourages the practice of Leave No Trace principles of outdoor travel to minimize human impact on the environment.

Footnotes

References
Adkinson, Ron Wild Northern California. The Globe Pequot Press, 2001

External links
 Wilderness.net webpage on management of the Kaiser Wilderness.

Sierra National Forest
Protected areas of the Sierra Nevada (United States)
Protected areas of Fresno County, California
Wilderness areas of California
IUCN Category Ib